Johannes Schinnagel (born 29 May 1996) is a German racing cyclist, who currently rides for UCI Continental team .

Major results
2018
 1st Stage 1 (TTT) Czech Cycling Tour
 6th Overall Tour of Antalya
 9th Giro del Belvedere
 10th Ghent–Wevelgem U23
2019
 10th Overall Oberösterreichrundfahrt

References

External links
 

1996 births
Living people
German male cyclists
Place of birth missing (living people)
People from Ansbach (district)
Sportspeople from Middle Franconia
Cyclists from Bavaria